"The Good Ones" is a song recorded by Canadian country artist Tebey and Canadian pop singer Marie-Mai. The song was written by Tebey with Kylie Sackley and Matt Rogers. It was the second single off Tebey's third studio album, The Good Ones.

Background
Tebey said while writing the song, he thought of "looking back at a lost love". The song was not originally intended to be a duet, but Tebey felt it was better served as a duet after recording the demo. He said Marie-Mai, a French-Canadian pop star, was his first choice and as they shared a mutual friend he was able to send her the song. Marie-Mai stated that she loves "trying different genres and breaking out of the boxes", and that she agreed to do the song immediately after hearing it.

Critical reception
Sterling Whitaker of Taste of Country said the song blends "contemporary country and lush pop elements for a progressive sound". The song was named Top Country Pick of the Week for October 11, 2019.

Commercial performance
"The Good Ones" reached a peak of number 8 on the Billboard Canada Country chart dated March 7, 2020, marking Tebey's sixth Top 10 hit. It also peaked at number 14 on the Hot Canadian Digital Song Sales chart, his second charting entry there after "Wake Me Up" in 2014. The song has been certified Gold by Music Canada.

Music video
The official music video for "The Good Ones" was directed by Raphael Mazzucco and premiered on Taste of Country on September 28, 2019. The video was filmed on Mazzucco's property in Connecticut and features both singers.

Charts

Certifications

Release history

References

2019 songs
2019 singles
Male–female vocal duets
Tebey songs
Songs written by Tebey
Song recordings produced by Danick Dupelle